The Our Lady of Lourdes Grotto Shrine is a Roman Catholic pilgrimage site in San Jose del Monte, Bulacan, Philippines.

History
The Our Lady of Lourdes Grotto Shrine was first opened to the public on February 11, 1965, coinciding with the Feast of Our Lady of Lourdes. The site was established by Horacio A. Guanzon and Anita Guidote-Guanzon, whose familial roots traces to wealthy families in Bulacan, Pampanga and Nueva Ecija. Guidote-Guanzon, after being cured of cancer following her family's pilgrimage to Lourdes, France, in 1961, decided to establish the grotto shrine as an act of thanksgiving, believing that the improvement of her condition was a miracle. The doctors who diagnosed her cancer projected that she only had six months to live but she went on to live for three more decades.

The Guanzons started a project to build a replica of the Rosary Basilica in Lourdes, France. After the death of Anita Guidote-Guanzon in 1990, the management of the grotto shrine was entrusted to their children, who oversaw the completion of the replica.

The eldest daughter of the Guanzons, Marietta Guanzon-Holmgren, asked the Diocese of Malolos in 2004 to send personnel to supervise religious rites at the grotto shrine. However, allegations arose that Guanzon-Holmgren was meddling too much on how clergymen sent by the diocese performed their duties. In 2005, the shrine was said to be not compliant on Roman Catholic guidelines on liturgy and worship leading to Bishop Jose Oliveros of Malolos

to stop recognizing the shrine as a Roman Catholic institution.

Status
The Our Lady of Lourdes Grotto Shrine is not officially recognized as a Catholic pilgrimage site by the Diocese of Malolos. In 2019, the diocese reiterated their non-recognition of the shrine and has said in a statement that priests holding rites at the site are suspended by the Catholic church.

Traditions

The Our Lady of Lourdes Grotto Shrine is often visited by Roman Catholics during the Lenten season. Every Maundy Thursday since 1966, devotees conduct a penitential walk, traversing by foot from northern Metro Manila (either Malinta, Valenzuela or Balintawak, Quezon City) to the grotto shrine. Devotees largely comes from the northern Metro Manila cities of Caloocan, Malabon, and Navotas, Novaliches, Quezon City and Valenzuela and the Bulacan city of Meycauayan. Non-Catholic Christians, including Philippine Independent Church members also use the grotto shrine as a pilgrimage site.

References

Buildings and structures in Bulacan
Our Lady of Lourdes
Catholic pilgrimage sites
1965 establishments in the Philippines
Buildings and structures completed in the 1960s
20th-century architecture in the Philippines